Ángel de los Santos Cano (born 3 November 1952 in Huelva, Spain), sometimes known as just Ángel, is a former Spanish professional association football player who played as a midfielder.

Honours
Real Madrid
La Liga: 1979–80
Copa del Rey: 1979–80, 1981–82
UEFA Cup: 1984–85
Copa de la Liga: 1985

References
 
 madridista.hu
 

1952 births
Living people
Footballers from Huelva
Spanish footballers
Association football midfielders
Recreativo de Huelva players
UE Sant Andreu footballers
Real Jaén footballers
UD Salamanca players
Real Madrid CF players
UEFA Cup winning players
La Liga players
Segunda División players
Segunda División B players